Morgan Township, Ohio may refer to several places:

Morgan Township, Ashtabula County, Ohio
Morgan Township, Butler County, Ohio
Morgan Township, Gallia County, Ohio
Morgan Township, Knox County, Ohio
Morgan Township, Morgan County, Ohio
Morgan Township, Scioto County, Ohio

Ohio township disambiguation pages